Shell Lake is a lake in Becker County, Minnesota, in the United States.

Shell Lake was likely named from the shells on the lakeshore.  Its name in the Ojibwe is Gaa-jiigajiwegamaag-zaaga'igan meaning "'lake lying near the mountain' lake", in reference to the lake's position along the Smoky Hills complex. Shell River flows out from this lake.

See also
List of lakes in Minnesota

References

Lakes of Minnesota
Lakes of Becker County, Minnesota